National Meteorological Center may mean or refer to:

 National Centers for Environmental Prediction, a meteorology center in the United States
 National Meteorological Center of CMA, a meteorology centre in the People's Republic of China

See also 
 NMC (disambiguation)